HIP 14810 d is an extrasolar planet approximately 165 light-years away in the constellation of Aries. This planet has mass at least 0.57 times that of Jupiter and orbits at 1.89 AU in an eccentric orbit.

References

Aries (constellation)
Exoplanets discovered in 2009
Giant planets
Exoplanets detected by radial velocity